The 2006 WNBA season was the seventh for the Seattle Storm. The Storm barely made the playoffs as the 4th seed, which they later lost to the Los Angeles Sparks in three games.

Offseason

WNBA Draft

Regular season

Season standings

Season schedule

Playoffs

Player stats

References

External links
Storm on Basketball Reference

Seattle Storm seasons
Seattle
2006 in sports in Washington (state)